Pawel Najdek (born 9 April 1973, in Nowy Tomyśl) is a Polish male weightlifter, competing in the +105 kg category and representing Poland at international competitions. He participated at the 2000 Summer Olympics in the +105 kg event and also at the 2004 Summer Olympics in the +105 kg event. He competed at world championships, most recently at the 2005 World Weightlifting Championships.

Major results
  2001 European Championships +105 kg (420.0 kg)
  2002 European Championships +105 kg (430.0 kg)
  2006 European Championships +105 kg (432.0 kg)
  2007 European Championships +105 kg (421.0 kg)

References

1973 births
Living people
Polish male weightlifters
Weightlifters at the 2000 Summer Olympics
Weightlifters at the 2004 Summer Olympics
Olympic weightlifters of Poland
People from Nowy Tomyśl County
World Weightlifting Championships medalists
Sportspeople from Greater Poland Voivodeship
20th-century Polish people
21st-century Polish people